Dorothy Cannell is an English-American mystery writer.

Biography
Dorothy Cannell was born in London, England. She moved to the United States in 1963 at the age of 20. She married Julian Cannell in 1964 and they lived in Peoria, Illinois, for many years before moving to Belfast, Maine. She is a mother of four and a grandmother of ten.

Bibliography
Cannell writes mysteries featuring Ellie Haskell, interior decorator, and Ben Haskell, writer and chef, and Hyacinth and Primrose Tramwell, a pair of dotty sisters and owners of the Flowers Detection Agency. Her first Ellie Haskell novel, The Thin Woman, was selected as one of the "100 Favorite Mysteries of the Twentieth Century" by the Independent Mystery Booksellers Association.

Ellie Haskell series
 The Thin Woman (1984)
 The Widow's Club (1988)
 Mum's the Word (1990)
 Femmes Fatal (1992)
 How to Murder Your Mother-In-Law (1994)
 How to Murder the Man of Your Dreams (1995)
 The Spring Cleaning Murders (1998)
 The Trouble with Harriet (1999)
 Bridesmaids Revisited (2000)
 The Importance of Being Ernestine (2002)
 Withering Heights (2007)
 Goodbye, Ms. Chips (2008)
 She Shoots to Conquer (2009)

Other novels and collections
 Down The Garden Path (1985)
 God Save the Queen (1997)
 Naked Came The Farmer (1998)
 The Sunken Sailor (2004)
 Sea Glass Summer (2012)
 The Family Jewels and Other Stories (Collection,2001)
 Murder at Mullings (2014)

Awards
Cannell's 1988 novel The Widows Club was nominated for the "Best Novel" award at the 1989 Anthony Awards and the Agatha Awards in the same year. She was also nominated for a "Best Short Story" Agatha Award in 1991, for "The High Cost of Living"; 1992, for "The January Sales Stowaway"; and 1996, for "Cupid's Arrow".

In 2014 Cannell received the Malice Domestic Award for Lifetime Achievement.

References

External links

English crime fiction writers
Writers from London
English emigrants to the United States
Living people
Writers from Peoria, Illinois
People from Belfast, Maine
Agatha Award winners
1943 births
Novelists from Maine
20th-century American novelists
21st-century American novelists
American mystery writers
American women novelists
Women mystery writers
Novelists from Illinois
21st-century American women writers